Black + Iconic is an American four-part television documentary series that premiered on February 18, 2023, on BET.

Episodes

References

External links

2020s American documentary television series
2020s American television miniseries
2023 American television series debuts
BET original programming
English-language television shows
Historical television series